Tripolitania is an historic region of Libya.

Tripolitania may also refer to:

 Tripolitania (Roman province)
 Islamic Tripolitania and Cyrenaica
 Ottoman Tripolitania
 Tripolitanian Republic
 Italian Tripolitania
 Tripolitania (province of Libya)

Disambiguation
 Tripoli (disambiguation)